Mercenasco is a comune (municipality) in the Metropolitan City of Turin in the Italian region Piedmont, located about  northeast of Turin.

References

Cities and towns in Piedmont